Sweatbox (or variations) may refer to:

 Box (torture), also known as a sweatbox, a method of solitary confinement used in humid and arid regions as a method of punishment
 Sweatbox (album), a live spoken-word album by Henry Rollins
 Sweat box, an animation industry term for rushes or dailies
 The Sweatbox, a documentary about the making of the film The Emperor's New Groove
 Sweatbox, an EP album by The Wolfgang Press